Boroughbridge High School is a mixed, nonselective, state secondary school in Boroughbridge, North Yorkshire, England.

The school was awarded arts specialist status in September 2003. The School's 2009 Ofsted Inspection report rated the school as Grade 2 (good).

Ofsted inspections 
Since the commencement of Ofsted inspections in September 1993, the school has undergone six inspections:

Notable former pupils 

  Darren Sadler, strongman and former under-105k World Champion

References

External links
 School web site

1982 establishments in England
Boroughbridge
Secondary schools in North Yorkshire
Educational institutions established in 1982
Community schools in North Yorkshire